Italian singer Mina has released seventy-four studio albums, three live albums, 44 official compilation albums, six video albums and seventeen extended plays.

Studio albums

Live albums

Compilation albums

Other compilations

Video albums

EPs

See also
 Mina singles discography
 List of best-selling albums in Italy

References

External links
 
 
 

Discographies of Italian artists
Pop music discographies
Blues discographies
Rock music discographies
Rhythm and blues discographies